Kirill Vadimovich Shchetinin (born 17 January 2002) is a Russian football player who plays for FC Rostov.

Club career
He appeared for FC Lokomotiv Moscow Under-19 team in the 2018–19 UEFA Youth League.

He moved to the youth team of FC Zenit Saint Petersburg in August 2019 and played for Zenit U19 in the 2019–20 UEFA Youth League.

On 26 July 2021, he joined FC Rostov on loan.

He made his debut in the Russian Premier League for Rostov on 23 October 2021 in a game against FC Arsenal Tula.

On 12 June 2022, Shchetinin moved to Rostov on a permanent basis and signed a 4.5-year contract. On 16 June 2022, Russian Premier League gave Shchetinin "Goal of the Year" award for his goal against FC Lokomotiv Moscow.

International career
In the 2019 UEFA European Under-17 Championship qualification, he became the top goalscorer with 8 goals for Russia. At the final tournament, he scored once as Russia did not advance from the group stage.

Career statistics

References

External links
 
 
 

2002 births
Living people
Sportspeople from Kursk
Russian footballers
Russia youth international footballers
Russia under-21 international footballers
Association football midfielders
FC Lokomotiv Moscow players
FC Zenit Saint Petersburg players
FC Rostov players
Russian Premier League players